Pablo Carreño Busta and Alex de Minaur were the defending champions, but Carreño Busta chose not to defend his title and de Minaur played alongside Cameron Norrie instead. They lost in the quarterfinals to Marcel Granollers and Horacio Zeballos.

Granollers and Zeballos went on to win the title, defeating Steve Johnson and Austin Krajicek in the final, 7–6(7–5), 7–6(7–5).

Seeds
The top four seeds received a bye into the second round.

Draw

Finals

Top half

Bottom half

References

External links
Main draw

Men's Doubles